Darthuizen is a hamlet in the Dutch municipality of Utrechtse Heuvelrug.

From 1818 to 1857, Darthuizen was a separate municipality. On 8 June 1857, it merged into the municipality of Leersum.

The hamlet was first mentioned in 1253 as Derthesen. The etymology is unclear. The postal authorities have placed it under Leersum. Since 2013, it has place name signs. In 1840, it was home to 228 people. Nowadays, it consists of about 40 houses.

Gallery

References

Former municipalities of Utrecht (province)
Populated places in Utrecht (province)
Utrechtse Heuvelrug